Deriglazov is a Russian masculine surname, its feminine counterpart is Deriglazova. Notable people with the surname include:

Ilya Deriglazov (born 1983), Russian football player
Inna Deriglazova (born 1990), Russian foil fencer

Russian-language surnames